Bali is a 2021 Indian Marathi language horror film directed by Vishal Furia and produced by GSEAMS. The film bankrolled by Arjun Singgh Baran and Kartik Nishandar, features Swapnil Joshi
and Pooja Sawant in lead roles. The film revolves around widowed father and  his seven year old son, who starts talking to a mysterious nurse. It was scheduled to be theatrically released on 16 April 2021, but its release was postponed due to the pandemic. The film premiered on Amazon Prime Video on 9 December 2021.

Synopsis
Life of a widowed father turns upside down when his seven year old son, faints and taken to hospital for a detailed diagnosis. The son starts talking to a mysterious nurse which he claims is staying in the deserted part of the hospital.

Cast
 Swwapnil Joshi as Shrikant Sathe
 Pooja Sawant as Dr. Radhika Shenoy
 Samarth Jadhav as Mandar Shrikant Sathe, Shrikant's son
 Pritam Kagne
 Rohit Kokate
 Sanjay Ranadive
 Shraddha Kaul
 Abhishek Bachankar
 Mahesh Bodas
 Umesh Ghalsasi

Production
In November 2019, Swapnil Joshi was cast to play lead role in the horror film. The filming was completed in February 2020. The post-production work of the film started in June 2020.

Reception
Pooja Darade of Leisure Byte rated the film with 3 stars out of five and praised the performance of Swapnil Joshi, writing, "he as the caring and worried father, did a fantastic job". Darade appreciated the performance of Samarth Jadhav as Mandar, writing, "[Samarth Jadhav] wowed me the most, he’s highly expressive in scenes and situations that demand only the best." Concluding she wrote, "Overall, Vishal Furia has delivered yet another terrifying and wicked narrative that needs your attention." She further wrote, "The premise is gripping, the screenplay is good in parts, and the performances are fantastic."

References

External links
 

Indian horror films
2020s Marathi-language films
Films set in hospitals
Films postponed due to the COVID-19 pandemic
Films not released in theaters due to the COVID-19 pandemic
Amazon Prime Video original films
2021 horror films